Saints-Anges is a municipality in the Municipalité régionale de comté de la Nouvelle-Beauce in Quebec, Canada. It is part of the Chaudière-Appalaches region and the population is 1,026 as of 2009.

The town was established in 1880, with part of the seigneurie of Sainte-Marie.

References

Commission de toponymie du Québec
Ministère des Affaires municipales, des Régions et de l'Occupation du territoire

Municipalities in Quebec
Incorporated places in Chaudière-Appalaches